Toon van Welsenes (7 October 1903 – 2 July 1974) was a Dutch athlete. He competed in the men's long jump at the 1928 Summer Olympics.

References

1903 births
1974 deaths
Athletes (track and field) at the 1928 Summer Olympics
Dutch male long jumpers
Olympic athletes of the Netherlands
Place of birth missing
20th-century Dutch people